Anoncia longa is a moth in the family Cosmopterigidae. It was described by Edward Meyrick in 1927. It is found in North America, where it has been recorded from Texas, New Mexico, Colorado, Utah and Arizona.

References

Natural History Museum Lepidoptera generic names catalog

Moths described in 1927
Cosmopteriginae
Moths of North America